Geoffrey Alan Blyth (27 July 1929 – 14 August 2007) was an English music critic, author, and musicologist who was particularly known for his writings within the field of opera. He was a specialist on singers and singing. Born in London, Blyth's earliest musical experiences were at Rugby School. He attended the music lectures of Professor Jack Westrup. After graduation from Pembroke College, Oxford, where he read history, he returned to London and worked in journalism and publishing. He wrote reviews, interviews and obituaries for The Times and for Gramophone. He was a long-time contributor to the British magazine Opera.

Articles

References 

C. Mackenzie. "Tribute: Alan Blyth", The Gramophone (2007), volume 85, issues 1024–1026, page 10.

English musicologists
1929 births
2007 deaths
English music critics
People educated at Rugby School
The Times people
Alumni of Pembroke College, Oxford
20th-century British musicologists